Todd Lynn Helton (born August 20, 1973) is an American former professional baseball first baseman who played his entire 17-year career for the Colorado Rockies of Major League Baseball (MLB). A five-time All-Star, four-time Silver Slugger, and three-time Gold Glove Award winner, Helton holds the Rockies' club records for hits (2,519), home runs (369), doubles (592), walks (1,335), runs scored (1,401), runs batted in (RBIs, with 1,406), games played (2,247), and total bases (4,292), among others.

Each season from 1999 to 2004, Helton met or exceeded all of the following totals: .320 batting average, 39 doubles, 30 home runs, 107 runs scored, 96 RBI, .577 slugging percentage and .981 on-base plus slugging. In 2000, he won the batting title with a .372 average, and also led MLB with a .698 slugging percentage, 59 doubles, and 147 RBI and the National League with 216 hits. Helton collected his 2,000th career hit against the Atlanta Braves on May 19, 2009, and his 2,500th against the Cincinnati Reds on September 1, 2013.

High school
Helton attended Central High School in Knoxville, Tennessee, and was a letterman in football and baseball. In football, he posted 2,772 total yards as quarterback. In baseball, as a senior, Helton posted a .655 batting average and 12 home runs and was named the Regional Player of the Year. Baseball America also bestowed on him All-American honors for his senior season. Helton was drafted in the 2nd round (55th overall) by the San Diego Padres during the 1992 MLB draft. He did not sign and chose to attend college.

University of Tennessee
Helton received an athletic scholarship from the University of Tennessee to play both football and baseball. He was named a Gatorade Player of the Year for football and baseball in Tennessee. As a freshman and sophomore, he backed up Heath Shuler at quarterback. Entering his junior season in 1994, he was the back-up to senior Jerry Colquitt and ahead of Peyton Manning (then a true freshman). After Colquitt tore knee ligaments in the season opener at UCLA, Helton took over as the starter. Three weeks later against Mississippi State, he suffered a knee injury and was replaced by Manning, who went on to break several records. Helton appeared in 12 games during his career with the Vols football team, completing 41 of 75 passes for 484 yards, four touchdowns and three interceptions.

In baseball, Helton was awarded the Dick Howser Trophy as National Collegiate Baseball Player of the Year, following his junior baseball season in 1995. During his career at Tennessee (1993–1995), he recorded a .370 batting average, with 38 home runs and 238 RBI (both school records), while also pitching 193 innings, registering an ERA of 2.24, with 172 strikeouts and 23 saves. In 1995, he set the Tennessee saves record with 11, while posting a 0.89 ERA. Helton also has the NCAA Division I record for most consecutive scoreless innings, at 47.

Helton spent the summer of 1994 playing for the Orleans Cardinals of the Cape Cod Baseball League and was named a league all-star.

MLB career

Draft and debut
Helton was the eighth overall pick of the 1995 Major League Baseball draft, selected in the first round by the Colorado Rockies, and signed on August 1, 1995. He spent the next two years in the minor leagues, playing for the class-A Asheville Tourists, AA New Haven Ravens, and AAA Colorado Springs Sky Sox before moving up to the majors. Helton made his major-league debut in 1997 on August 2, a 6–5 road loss to the Pittsburgh Pirates. He started in left field, flied out in his first at-bat, singled in his next time up off Francisco Córdova, and hit a solo home run off Marc Wilkins.

1997–1999: Early career
During the 1997 season, Helton hit .280/.337/.484 (batting average, on-base percentage, slugging percentage), with five home runs, in 35 games played. When Rockies first baseman Andrés Galarraga went to the Atlanta Braves in 1998, Helton became the full-time starter at first base for Colorado during the 1998 season. The Rockies named Helton their club representative in 1998, the first time the team ever gave a rookie that role.  He hit .315/.380/.530, with 25 home runs and 97 RBI, in 152 games played. Helton led all major-league rookies in average (.315), home runs (25), RBI (97), multi-hit games (49), total bases (281), slugging percentage (.530) and extra base hits (63). He also led all National League rookies in runs (78), hits (167) and on-base percentage (.380). At the time, only Mike Piazza (35), David Justice (28) and Darryl Strawberry (26) had hit more home runs as an NL rookie since 1972, and only Piazza had more RBI (112). Helton finished second to Kerry Wood of the Chicago Cubs in the voting for National League Rookie of the Year. The Tennessee Sports Hall of Fame named Helton its 1998 Professional Athlete of the Year.

In 1999, Helton had a .320 batting average, .395 on-base percentage and .587 slugging percentage.  He also hit 35 home runs and 113 RBI, while drawing 68 walks. On June 19, 1999, in a 10–2 Rockies home win over the Florida Marlins, Helton hit for the cycle. He fell short of hitting a second cycle on four occasions during the 1999 season, which would have made him only the second player since 1900 (Babe Herman was the first to do so in 1931) to hit two cycles in one season.

2000–2006: Mid-career

Helton enjoyed arguably his best season in 2000, leading the major leagues in batting average (.372), RBI (147), doubles (59), total bases (405), extra base hits (103), slugging percentage (.698) and OPS (1.162).  He led the National League in hits (216) and on-base percentage (.463).  Helton hit a league-leading home batting average of .391 and placed third in the National League in road batting average (.353). Helton's MLB-leading 103 extra base hits tied for the fourth most in MLB history and the second most in NL history. His National League-leading numbers in on-base percentage, slugging percentage and batting average gave him the "percentage triple crown." Helton became the second Rockies player, after Larry Walker in 1999, to accomplish that feat. Helton and Walker made the Rockies the first team in MLB history to record percentage triple crowns in consecutive seasons with different players. Helton became only the fourth player in National League history to lead the NL in both batting average and RBI. He became the first player in National League history and the fifth player in MLB history (Babe Ruth, Lou Gehrig, Jimmie Foxx and Hank Greenberg are the others) to have at least 200 hits, 40 home runs, 100 RBI, 100 runs, 100 extra base hits and 100 walks in one season.

Helton was invited to his first career Major League Baseball All-Star Game in 2000. He also received National League Player of the Month honors for May and August. He finished fifth in voting for the MVP award. However, the Associated Press, Sporting News, USA Baseball Alumni and Baseball Digest all named Helton the MLB Player of the Year. Buck O'Neil and the Negro Leagues Baseball Museum presented Helton with the Walter Fenner "Buck" Leonard Legacy Award. Helton was also given the team-honored version of the Roberto Clemente Man of Year Award, for his community contributions to Eastern Tennessee. Furthermore, he was the National League winner of the second annual Hank Aaron Award. Each season from 2000 to 2003, he was named the Rockies Player of the Year. For all of his success, the Colorado Rockies rewarded Helton with a nine-year, $141.5 million contract in April 2001 that took effect in 2003.

The following season, Helton posted a career-high 49 home runs (22 of them occurred away from Coors Field). The 49 home runs tied teammate Larry Walker for the most home runs ever by a Colorado Rockies player in a single season. Additionally, Helton had a .336 batting average, .432 on-base percentage and .685 slugging percentage. He also had 105 extra base hits, making him the first player in MLB history to have at least 100 total extra base hits in back-to-back seasons. Furthermore, Helton attained 402 total bases, making him only the fourth player in MLB history to do so in consecutive seasons (Chuck Klein, Gehrig and Foxx are the others). Helton appeared in his second consecutive All-Star game in 2001 — his first as a starter. He won his first Gold Glove at first base and was once again a top candidate for MVP, but was overshadowed by Sammy Sosa and Barry Bonds.

In 2002, Helton had a .329 batting average, 30 home runs, 109 RBI, 98 walks, 107 runs, .577 slg % and 319 total bases. He became the first player in Rockies history to score at least 100 runs in four consecutive seasons. He was named Player of the Month for May, as he hit .347 with six doubles, one triple, 10 home runs and 28 RBI during the month. Helton was named to his third consecutive All-Star game — his second straight as a starter. He also received his second consecutive Gold Glove.

2003 saw Helton involved in the closest NL batting race in history, as he hit .35849, while St. Louis Cardinals first baseman Albert Pujols finished first with a .35871 batting average. During the season, Helton also had 33 home runs, 117 RBI, 135 runs, 49 doubles and five triples. He won his fourth Player of the Month honor during the month of April, as he hit .337 with six home runs, 27 RBI, 28 runs, 11 doubles and 24 walks. He also appeared in his fourth consecutive All-Star game.

During the 2004 season, Helton again finished second in the NL batting race, as he hit .347, while San Francisco Giants left fielder Barry Bonds hit .362. Helton also had 32 home runs and 96 RBI on the season. He became the first player in MLB history to hit at least .315 with 25 home runs and 95 RBI in each of his first seven full seasons in the majors. He became only the third player in MLB history to accomplish that feat during any seven-year stretch in a career (Lou Gehrig and Babe Ruth are the others). He set a franchise record by hitting at least 30 home runs in six consecutive seasons. Helton was named to his team-record fifth consecutive All-Star game and won his third Gold Glove during the season.

In 2005, Helton spent time on the disabled list (July 26 – August 9) for the first time in his career with a strained left calf muscle. He hit .320 with 20 home runs, 79 RBI, 92 runs and 45 doubles for the season. He was under 1.000 in OPS (finished with .979 OPS) for the first time since 1999. Helton also was not named to the National League All-Star team for the first time since 1999. However, he did end up joining Gehrig and Bill Terry as the only first basemen in MLB history to have at least a .315 batting average in eight consecutive seasons. Also in 2005, St. Louis Cardinals radio broadcaster Wayne Hagin claimed manager Don Baylor said that Helton had "tried the juice" in the 1990s, implying steroid use. Helton vehemently denied the allegation and considered legal action against Hagin. Hagin later apologized clarifying his comments saying he was "referring to supplements, creatine, not steroids" when he said "juiced". Baylor said of his conversation with Hagin, "We discussed creatine and that was the end of the conversation. Steroid use was never even a question with me in regards to Todd Helton. [Hagin] has his facts wrong."

The following season, Helton had to spend time on the disabled list again, this time from April 20 to May 4, 2006, as he was diagnosed with acute terminal ileitis. He hit .302 with 15 home runs, 81 RBI, 40 doubles, 91 walks and a .404 on-base percentage for the season. He ended the season below .900 in OPS (he had .880 OPS) for the first time since entering the league in 1997 when he only played 35 games that year. Helton finished third on the Rockies roster in 2006 in runs (94), hits (165), doubles (40), total bases (260) and multi-hit games (42).

2007–2013

Helton's power and RBI production stayed relatively level to his previous year's stats during the 2007 season, as he managed 17 home runs and 91 RBI. Despite these numbers being below his career averages, Helton  kept up his string of seven consecutive seasons with an on-base percentage higher than .400, nine consecutive seasons with a batting average above .300, and had also been walked more times than he had struck out (a feat he had accomplished in seven of his first ten full seasons). Helton recorded his 1,000th career hit at Coors Field on June 20, 2007, in a 6–1 home win over the New York Yankees, becoming only the fifth active player to have 1,000 career hits in one ballpark. On September 9, in 4–2 home victory over the San Diego Padres, Helton hit his 35th double of the season. This made him the only player in MLB history to have hit 35 or more doubles in at least 10 consecutive seasons (1998–2007). Helton hit his 300th career home run on September 16, in a 13–0 home win over the Florida Marlins. He became the first player to hit 300 home runs for the Rockies.

Helton made what was arguably the most pivotal play of the Rockies' 2007 season in the second game of a doubleheader against the Los Angeles Dodgers on September 18. In the bottom of the ninth inning, with two outs and two strikes, Helton hit an emotional two-run walk-off home run off Dodgers closer Takashi Saito. The home run kept the Rockies alive in the bid to win the wild card or National League West title. The Rockies eventually clinched the National League wild card, in a 9–8 extra innings victory over the Padres in a wild card tie-breaker game, allowing Helton to appear in the playoffs for the first time in his career. Colorado went on to sweep the Philadelphia Phillies in three games of the National League Division Series. Helton hit a triple in the first pitch of his first career playoff at-bat in the opening game against the Phillies at Philadelphia. The Rockies also swept the Arizona Diamondbacks in four games of the National League Championship Series, sending the Rockies on their first trip to the World Series in franchise history. The Rockies went on to lose the World Series to the Boston Red Sox in a four-game sweep.

In August 2008, Helton was diagnosed with a degenerative back condition, putting his health and ability to continue play in question. On May 19, 2009, Helton got his 2,000th hit, a single, as part of an 8–1 road loss to the Atlanta Braves. On July 22, 2009, Helton hit his 500th career double in a 4–3 home victory over the Arizona Diamondbacks.  He became the 50th player in MLB history to hit 500 career doubles and the fastest to do since 1954. Helton also joined Babe Ruth, Stan Musial, Lou Gehrig and Ted Williams as the only players in MLB history to have at least 500 doubles, 320 home runs and a .325 batting average for a career. On March 11, 2010, Helton signed a two-year contract extension through the 2013 season. The extension for 2012 and 2013 was worth a total of $9.9 million.

Helton's degenerative back condition sent him back to the disabled list in July 2010. Helton returned from the DL in August and hit .256 with 8 home runs and 37 RBI for the season. After the 2010 season, Helton said he would return to the Rockies in 2011, following rumors of a possible retirement. On February 15, 2011, Helton announced his intention to play baseball for three more years, preferably for the Rockies.  On June 30 he played his 2,000th career game. On April 14, 2012, Helton hit a 2-run walk-off home run, his 7th of his career. On July 13, Helton was placed on the 15-day disabled list due to inflammation in his right hip. In 63 games, he was batting .235. After returning from the DL, Helton played only 6 games before announcing that he would have season ending hip surgery in order to prepare for the 2013 season. Helton was healthier in 2013, playing in 124 games while hitting 15 home runs with 61 RBIs.

On September 14, 2013, Helton announced that he would be retiring at the conclusion of the 2013 season. On September 25, 2013, before his last game at Coors Field, Helton was honored by the Rockies Organization in a pre-game ceremony. In the game, Helton hit a home run and drove in three runs versus the Boston Red Sox.

On August 17, 2014, the Rockies retired Helton's number 17 before a 2:05 pm day game at Coors Field. Helton is the first Rockies player to have his number retired in the team's twenty-six year history.

Accomplishments

 Baseball Digest All-Star Rookie Team (1998)
 Associated Press Major League Baseball All-Star Team (2000)
 Baseball Digest Major League Baseball Player of the Year (2000)
 USA Baseball Alumni Player of the Year (2000)

Achievements
 National League Batting Champion (2000)
 National League slugging percentage leader (2000)
 National League RBI leader (2000)
 National League Doubles leader (2000, Helton hit 59 doubles during the season, which tied Chuck Klein for the third-highest single-season doubles total in NL history.)
 Hit for the cycle (June 19, 1999)
 Percentage triple crown (2000)
 National League Hits leader (2000)
 National League On-Base Percentage leader (2000, 2005, 2007)
 National League Total Bases leader (2000)
 National League Extra Base Hits leader (2000)
 Colorado Rockies career leader in games played (2,247), at bats (7,962), runs (1,401), hits (2,519), total bases (4,292), doubles (592), home runs (369), RBI (1,406), walks (1,335), and intentional walks (185).
Colorado Rockies number 17 was retired August 17, 2014.

Helton has appeared on balloting for the National Baseball Hall of Fame since 2019, when he received 16.5% of the vote, well short of the 75% required for election, but above the 5% minimum required to remain on the ballot. His support has increased to 72.2% as of the 2023 ballot, his fifth appearance. A player may appear on the ballot a maximum of 10 times.

Post-playing career
On April 9, 2022, Helton was hired by the Colorado Rockies to serve as a special assistant to the general manager, joining Vinny Castilla and Clint Hurdle in the role.

Personal life
Helton's jersey number, 17, is a tribute to former Chicago Cubs first baseman Mark Grace.

Helton and his family — wife Christy and two daughters — reside in Knoxville, Tennessee. They previously lived in Brighton, Colorado, but sold the property in 2018. Helton and his family are good friends with Helton's former Tennessee Volunteers football teammate and former National Football League (NFL) quarterback Peyton Manning.

In 2013, Helton was arrested in Colorado for driving under the influence of alcohol. He was fined $400, received a year of probation, and was ordered to undergo 24 hours of community service. In 2019, Helton was cited for another DUI after crashing his car. He subsequently entered a treatment program.

See also

 List of Colorado Rockies team records
 List of Major League Baseball annual doubles leaders
 List of Major League Baseball annual putouts leaders
 List of Major League Baseball career assists as a first baseman leaders
 List of Major League Baseball career bases on balls leaders
 List of Major League Baseball career batting average leaders
 List of Major League Baseball career doubles leaders
 List of Major League Baseball career hits leaders
 List of Major League Baseball career home run leaders
 List of Major League Baseball career on-base percentage leaders
 List of Major League Baseball career OPS leaders
 List of Major League Baseball career putouts as a first baseman leaders
 List of Major League Baseball career runs batted in leaders
 List of Major League Baseball career runs scored leaders
 List of Major League Baseball career slugging percentage leaders
 List of Major League Baseball career total bases leaders
 List of Major League Baseball doubles records
 List of Major League Baseball players to hit for the cycle
 List of Major League Baseball players who spent their entire career with one franchise
 List of National League annual slugging percentage leaders
 List of people from Knoxville, Tennessee
 List of University of Tennessee people

References

External links

 Todd Helton Q&A
 Todd Helton's MLB Blog
 Todd Helton news
 Todd Helton Through the Years

1973 births
Living people
Colorado Rockies players
American football quarterbacks
Baseball players from Knoxville, Tennessee
Major League Baseball first basemen
National League All-Stars
National League batting champions
National League RBI champions
Players of American football from Knoxville, Tennessee
Tennessee Republicans
Tennessee Volunteers football players
Tennessee Volunteers baseball players
Orleans Firebirds players
Asheville Tourists players
New Haven Ravens players
Colorado Springs Sky Sox players
Casper Ghosts players
Grand Junction Rockies players
Silver Slugger Award winners
People from Brighton, Colorado
Major League Baseball players with retired numbers